Charles Edward Betts (born March 8, 1986) is an American professional wrestler and former amateur wrestler. He is currently signed to WWE, where he performs on the Raw brand under the ring name Chad Gable. He is a four-time tag team champion in WWE.

A prolific amateur wrestler who competed at the 2012 Summer Olympics in London, Betts signed with WWE in late 2013 and underwent training before he was deployed to developmental branch NXT. A tag team specialist, he won the NXT Tag Team Championship with his partner Jason Jordan as American Alpha, before being called up to the main roster in 2016, where the two won the SmackDown Tag Team Championship before disbanding in mid-2017. He formed a tag team with Shelton Benjamin before being traded to Raw in the 2018 Superstar Shake-up and subsequently forming a team with Bobby Roode, winning the Raw Tag Team Championship with him in December 2018. With this, Gable became the second man (after his former tag team partner Jason Jordan) to hold the NXT, Raw, and SmackDown Tag Team Championships. In January 2022, Gable won the Raw Tag Team Championship for a second time with tag partner, Otis.

Early life 
Charles Edwards Betts was born in Saint Michael, Minnesota. He is a graduate of Northern Michigan University. He received his master's degree from Full Sail University in October 2021.

Amateur wrestling career 
Betts was a Minnesota high school state champion. (2004)  He defeated Jordan Holm 2 to 0 in the final of the 2012 U.S. Olympic Trials in the 84 kg category. He progressed to the 2012 Summer Olympics, where he competed in the Greco-Roman style 84kg event. He defeated Keitani Graham from the Federated States of Micronesia in the qualification round. He was eliminated from the competition in the next round by Pablo Shorey of Cuba, losing 3–0.

Professional wrestling career

WWE

Training (2013–2015) 
In November 2013, Betts signed a contract with the professional wrestling promotion WWE. He was assigned to the WWE Performance Center in Orlando, Florida and adopted the ring name Chad Gable (a nod to Olympian Dan Gable). He made his in-ring debut at a NXT house show in Cocoa Beach, Florida on September 5, 2014, defeating Troy McClain. He had a match against then debuting Braun Strowman at an NXT live event in Jacksonville, Florida on December 19, 2014 in a losing effort. He made his television debut on the January 8, 2015 episode of NXT, losing to Tyler Breeze.

American Alpha (2015–2017) 

Starting in May 2015, NXT newcomer Chad Gable began a storyline with Jason Jordan, in which he tried to convince Jordan to form a new partnership, following the dissolution of Jordan's team with Tye Dillinger. After nearly two months of coaxing, Jordan finally agreed to a tag team match with Gable as his teammate. On the July 15 episode of NXT, Jordan and Gable were successful in their official debut together against the team of Elias Samson and Steve Cutler. On September 2, Jordan and Gable competed in the first round of the Dusty Rhodes Tag Team Classic tournament, beating the team of Neville and Solomon Crowe. After defeating the Hype Bros, they would get eliminated from the tournament by the team of Baron Corbin and Rhyno. Originally villains, the duo turned into fan favorites even in defeat, when they showed fighting spirit and resiliency throughout the match. At NXT TakeOver: London, Gable and Jordan were successful in a fatal four-way tag team match which was taped for the December 23 episode of NXT. On the January 8 tapings of NXT, the team of Jordan and Gable began using the name American Alpha.

American Alpha faced off with the Vaudevillains on the March 16 episode of NXT in a number one contender's match where they emerged victorious, earning them an NXT Tag Team Championship match against Dash and Dawson, now called "The Revival", at NXT TakeOver: Dallas. The pair won the NXT Tag Team Championship at the event. On June 8 at NXT TakeOver: The End, American Alpha lost the titles back to The Revival, ending their reign at 68 days. After the match, they were assaulted by the debuting Authors of Pain (Akam and Rezar), who were managed by the legendary manager, Paul Ellering. The pair subsequently failed to win back the NXT Tag Team Championship after being defeated by the Revival in a two out of three falls match on the July 6 episode of NXT, before wrestling their final match on the brand on July 20, where they were defeated by The Authors of Pain.

As a result of the 2016 WWE draft on July 19, the team was drafted to the SmackDown brand, being their first tag team pick overall. On the August 2 episode of SmackDown, American Alpha made their debut, defeating The Vaudevillains. The pair teamed with The Usos and The Hype Bros at SummerSlam to defeat the team of The Ascension, Breezango and The Vaudevillains. The pair then entered an eight-tag team tournament which would determine the inaugural SmackDown Tag Team Champions, defeating Breezango in the first round to advance to the semi-finals where they faced The Usos. Despite defeating The Usos quickly on the September 6 episode of SmackDown, Gable's knee was kayfabe injured during a post-match assault when the Usos turned heel, rendering American Alpha unable to compete at Backlash and undoing their attempts to become the inaugural champions.

They returned on the September 20 episode to face the Usos in a number one contender's match to establish who would face inaugural Smackdown Tag Team Champions Heath Slater and Rhyno at No Mercy, where they were defeated due to Gable's injury, marking their first loss on the main roster. At the event, they would instead team with the Hype Bros to face the Ascension and the Vaudevillians where they were successful. On the November 1 episode of SmackDown, American Alpha defeated The Spirit Squad to qualify for Team SmackDown for the 10–on–10 Survivor Series tag team elimination match at Survivor Series. Team SmackDown was defeated by Team Raw at the event, with American Alpha being eliminated by Luke Gallows and Karl Anderson after eliminating The Shining Stars.

On the December 27 episode of SmackDown Live, they defeated Randy Orton and Luke Harper of The Wyatt Family, Heath Slater and Rhyno, and The Usos in a four corners elimination match to become the new SmackDown Tag Team Champions, celebrating with their families afterward. After defeating The Wyatt Family (Orton and Harper) in a rematch to retain their titles on January 10, the pair would go on to defend their titles in a tag team turmoil match at Elimination Chamber successfully against The Ascension, Usos, Vaudevillians, Breezango and Heath Slater & Rhyno, entering fourth and eliminating the Usos and Ascension, despite an attack by the Usos after their elimination, continuing their feud. On the March 21 episode of SmackDown Live, American Alpha lost the SmackDown Tag Team Championships to The Usos after suffering a non-title match loss to the pair the prior week. After making their Wrestlemania debut at WrestleMania 33 where both were unsuccessful in winning the Andre the Giant Memorial Battle Royal they failed in their championship rematch with the Usos, being attacked by Primo and Epico afterward, who defeated them the following week.

On the June 20 episode of SmackDown, Chad Gable answered the United States Championship Open Challenge put forward by champion Kevin Owens where he was ultimately unsuccessful. In a July interview, Gable spoke about going solo, citing his will to fight against top competition. On the July 17 episode of Raw, Jason Jordan was moved to the Raw brand. This effectively disbanded the team.

Tag team specialist (2017–2019) 
On the August 22 episode of SmackDown Live, General Manager Daniel Bryan announced that he had signed a returning Shelton Benjamin to team up with Gable, therefore creating a tag-team between the two. The following week on SmackDown Live, Gable and Benjamin picked up a win over The Ascension in their first match as a tag team; this was also Benjamin's first WWE match since 2010. On the September 12 episode of SmackDown Live, Benjamin and Gable would defeat The Hype Bros, before defeating them again in a rematch at Hell in a Cell. On the October 10 episode of SmackDown Live, Benjamin and Gable would defeat The Hype Bros, The Ascension and Breezango in a fatal four-way match to become the number one contenders for The Usos' SmackDown Tag Team Championship. On the November 7 episode of SmackDown Live, they received their title opportunity and won the match by count-out, however, the Usos retained their championships. After trading victories with The Usos the following weeks, they competed in a fatal four-way match for the SmackDown Tag Team Championships against defending champions The Usos, The New Day, and the team of Rusev and Aiden English at Clash of Champions, but failed to win the titles. Two days later on SmackDown Live, Gable and Benjamin defeated The Usos in a non-title match. They had quietly turned heel during the period of time where they had been challenging The Usos for the Smackdown Live Tag Team Championships by showing more villainous tactics.

On the January 2, 2018 episode of SmackDown Live, they defeated The New Day and Rusev and English in a triple threat match to earn another shot at the SmackDown Tag Team titles, which they lost the following week after pinning the wrong twin for the apparent victory and then losing the impromptu rematch. The following week on SmackDown Live, the duo confirmed their heel turn when they insulted the referee of their title match the week before, demoralized the fans, and accused General Manager Daniel Bryan of being biased, which resulted in Bryan booking them for a two out of three falls match against The Usos at Royal Rumble, where they lost in two straight falls. That following week, Gable and Benjamin interrupted an episode of Fashion Files, and traded insults with Breezango (Tyler Breeze and Fandango), challenging them to a match, Gable and Benjamin would eventually win the match. The next week, Gable and Benjamin mocked The New Day and faced them in a losing effort. On March 27 episode of SmackDown Live, he accompanied Benjamin to a match against Shinsuke Nakamura in a losing effort, after which they attacked WWE Champion AJ Styles before being fought off by Nakamura.

On April 16, Gable was moved to Raw as part of the 2018 WWE Superstar Shake-Up, thus disbanding with Benjamin. On the April 23 episode of Raw, Gable turned face after he took offense at Jinder Mahal insulting Raw General Manager Kurt Angle. Gable would defeat Mahal on his first match on the brand. On the September 3 episode of Raw, Gable formed a tag team with Bobby Roode and went on to defeat The Ascension. At Survivor Series, they would become captains for Team Raw, but lost to Team SmackDown in the 10-on-10 Survivor Series tag team elimination match. During this time, Gable changed his attire to trunks and began wearing a robe in his entrance, mirroring Roode's look. On the December 10 episode of Raw, Gable and Roode defeated AOP (Akam and Rezar) and their manager Drake Maverick in a three-on-two handicap to capture the Raw Tag Team Championship. With the win, Gable became the second man (after his former partner Jason Jordan) to have won the NXT, SmackDown, and Raw Tag Team Championships.

At the Royal Rumble kick-off show, Gable and Roode defeated Rezar and Scott Dawson in a non-title match. The match stipulation stated that if Rezar and Dawson were to win, their respective teams (AOP and The Revival) would both receive tag team championship matches. The Revival would eventually receive their title match on the February 11 episode of Raw, in which Gable and Roode lost the championship. Gable and Roode failed to regain the championship from The Revival in a triple threat tag-team match also involving Ricochet and Aleister Black at Fastlane on March 11.

Shorty G (2019–2020) 
During the 2019 WWE Superstar Shake-up, Gable was drafted to SmackDown. Roode remained on Raw, effectively ending the team. Gable made a surprise appearance on the June 11 episode of 205 Live, sporting a shorter haircut and trunks (as opposed to a singlet). He defeated Gentleman Jack Gallagher by count-out. The two had a rematch on the July 16 episode of 205 Live, where Gable emerged victorious.

In August, Gable was announced as one of sixteen competitors in the King of the Ring. On the August 27 episode of SmackDown Live, Gable defeated Shelton Benjamin in the first round of the tournament. Gable would eventually make it to the finals, defeating Andrade in the quarterfinals and Shane McMahon, who was a replacement for an injured Elias, in the semifinals. Gable was then set to face Baron Corbin in the finals on the September 16 episode of Raw, but was ultimately defeated. At Hell in a Cell, Gable defeated King Corbin, with the announcer announcing him as "Shorty Gable" (upon Corbin's request making fun of his height), which officially became his ring name. On the October 18 episode of SmackDown, Gable would shorten his name to "Shorty G".

At the Crown Jewel event, Shorty G competed in a ten-man tag team match as a part of Team Hogan, coming out victorious against Team Flair. At Survivor Series, Shorty G competed as a part of Team SmackDown, and was eliminated by Kevin Owens. However his team won the match. After this event, Shorty G continued to wrestle in the tag team division with Mustafa Ali as his partner. On the January 3, 2020 episode of SmackDown, Sheamus returned from injury, appearing to save Shorty G from an attack by The Revival (Dash Wilder and Scott Dawson), but then delivered a Brogue Kick to him. Sheamus then defeated Shorty G at Royal Rumble and on the January 31 episode of SmackDown. After three months away from television, Shorty G made his return on the May 29 episode of SmackDown in a 10-man battle royal for a spot in the Intercontinental Championship tournament but was eliminated by Cesaro. Later on in the night, Shorty G defeated Cesaro. On the July 31 episode of SmackDown, Shorty G turned heel by attacking Matt Riddle from behind and aligning himself with King Corbin, however, the alliance storyline was dropped.

Alpha Academy (2020–present) 

On the October 23 episode of SmackDown, after losing to Lars Sullivan, he announced that he had quit being "Shorty G" and reverted to the ring name Chad Gable. On November 13 episode of SmackDown, Gable opened the Alpha Academy and attempted to recruit Otis as his client, turning face in the process. The team made their debut on December 11 episode of SmackDown in a defeat to the team of Cesaro and Shinsuke Nakamura. At TLC: Tables, Ladders and Chairs, Gable and Otis teamed with Big E and Daniel Bryan to defeat Cesaro, Nakamura, King Corbin, and Intercontinental Champion Sami Zayn in an eight-man tag team match. On the February 19, 2021 episode of SmackDown, Gable ordered Otis to attack Rey Mysterio after their tag team match, reverting back to a heel once again.

As part of the 2021 Draft, both Gable and Otis were drafted to the Raw brand. On the January 10, 2022 episode of Raw, Alpha Academy defeated RK-Bro (Randy Orton and Riddle) to win the WWE Raw Tag Team Championship, marking Gable's second reign with the title. On the March 7, 2022 episode of Raw, Alpha Academy dropped the titles back to RK-Bro, ending their reign at 55 days.  On Day 2 of WrestleMania 38 on April 3, Alpha Academy failed to regain the titles from RK-Bro in a triple-threat match also involving The Street Profits.

While with the Alpha Academy, Gable began screaming "shoosh" at various wrestlers in backstage segmenets. This was done alongside another new catchphrase, "ah, thank you."

On the March 13, 2023, episode of Raw, Gable found Otis backstage taking part in a photo shoot with Maximum Male Models (MMM). Otis decided to leave with MMM instead of Gable, hinting at a breakup of the Alpha Academy.

Personal life 
Betts married Kristi Oliver, who he had been dating for nine years, on June 19, 2011. The couple have three children together.

Betts is a member of the Comanche Nation.

Other media
As Chad Gable, he made his video game debut as a playable character in WWE 2K17, and has since appeared in WWE 2K18, WWE 2K19, WWE 2K20, WWE 2K22 and WWE 2K23.

Championships and accomplishments

Amateur wrestling 
 High School
 Minnesota State Wrestling Champion (2004)
Minnesota State Wrestling 4th Place (2003)
 International Medals
 World University Games silver medal (2006)
 Pan-American Championships Gold medal (2012)
 Gedza International silver medal (2012)
 Pan-American Olympic Qualifier silver medal (2012)
 Granma Cup Bronze medal (2012)
 Dave Schultz Memorial International Gold medal (2012)
 Olympic Games
 U.S. Olympic Trials Champion (2012)

Professional wrestling 

Pro Wrestling Illustrated
Ranked No. 83 of the top 500 singles wrestlers in the PWI 500 in 2019
 Rolling Stone
 Most Promising Youngster of the Year (2017)
 Wrestling Observer Newsletter
 Rookie of the Year (2015)
 Most Underrated (2019)
 Worst Gimmick (2019) as Shorty G
 WWE
 NXT Tag Team Championship (1 time) – with Jason Jordan
 WWE Raw Tag Team Championship (2 times) – with Bobby Roode (1) and Otis (1)
 WWE SmackDown Tag Team Championship (1 time) – with Jason Jordan

References

External links 

 
 
 
 
 

1986 births
American male professional wrestlers
American male sport wrestlers
Living people
Olympic wrestlers of the United States
Professional wrestlers from Minnesota
Wrestlers at the 2012 Summer Olympics
NXT Tag Team Champions
People from St. Michael, Minnesota
Sportspeople from the Minneapolis–Saint Paul metropolitan area
21st-century professional wrestlers